Lattice QCD is a well-established non-perturbative approach to solving the quantum chromodynamics (QCD) theory of quarks and gluons. It is a lattice gauge theory formulated on a grid or lattice of points in space and time. When the size of the lattice is taken infinitely large and its sites infinitesimally close to each other, the continuum QCD is recovered.
 
Analytic or perturbative solutions in low-energy QCD are hard or impossible to obtain due to the highly nonlinear nature of the strong force and the large coupling constant at low energies. This formulation of QCD in discrete rather than continuous spacetime naturally introduces a momentum cut-off at the order 1/a, where a is the lattice spacing, which regularizes the theory. As a result, lattice QCD is mathematically well-defined. Most importantly, lattice QCD provides a framework for investigation of non-perturbative phenomena such as confinement and quark–gluon plasma formation, which are intractable by means of analytic field theories.

In lattice QCD, fields representing quarks are defined at lattice sites (which leads to fermion doubling), while the gluon fields are defined on the links connecting neighboring sites.  This approximation approaches continuum QCD as the spacing between lattice sites is reduced to zero.  Because the computational cost of numerical simulations can increase dramatically as the lattice spacing decreases, results are often extrapolated to a = 0 by repeated calculations at different lattice spacings a that are large enough to be tractable.

Numerical lattice QCD calculations using Monte Carlo methods can be extremely computationally intensive, requiring the use of the largest available supercomputers.  To reduce the computational burden, the so-called quenched approximation can be used, in which the quark fields are treated as non-dynamic "frozen" variables.  While this was common in early lattice QCD calculations, "dynamical" fermions are now standard.  These simulations typically utilize algorithms based upon molecular dynamics or microcanonical ensemble algorithms.

At present, lattice QCD is primarily applicable at low densities where the numerical sign problem does not interfere with calculations. Monte Carlo methods are free from the sign problem when applied to the case of QCD with gauge group SU(2) (QC2D).

Lattice QCD has already successfully agreed with many experiments. For example, the mass of the proton has been determined theoretically with an error of less than 2 percent.

Lattice QCD has also been used as a benchmark for high-performance computing, an approach originally developed in the context of the IBM Blue Gene supercomputer.

Techniques

Monte-Carlo simulations

Monte-Carlo is a method to pseudo-randomly sample a large space of variables.
The importance sampling technique used to select the gauge configurations in the Monte-Carlo simulation imposes the use of Euclidean time, by a Wick rotation of spacetime.

In lattice Monte-Carlo simulations the aim is to calculate correlation functions. This is done by explicitly calculating the action, using field configurations which are chosen according to the distribution function, which depends on the action and the fields. Usually one starts with the gauge bosons part and gauge-fermion interaction part of the action to calculate the gauge configurations, and then uses the simulated gauge configurations to calculate hadronic propagators and correlation functions.

Fermions on the lattice
Lattice QCD is a way to solve the theory exactly from first principles, without any assumptions, to the desired precision. However, in practice the calculation power is limited, which requires a smart use of the available resources. One needs to choose an action which gives the best physical description of the system, with minimum errors, using the available computational power. The limited computer resources force one to use approximate physical constants which are different from their true physical values:
 The lattice discretization means approximating continuous and infinite space-time by a finite lattice spacing and size. The smaller the lattice, and the bigger the gap between nodes, the bigger the error. Limited resources commonly force the use of smaller physical lattices and larger lattice spacing than wanted, leading to larger errors than wanted.
 The quark masses are also approximated. Quark masses are larger than experimentally measured. These have been steadily approaching their physical values, and within the past few years a few collaborations have used nearly physical values to extrapolate down to physical values.

In order to compensate for the errors one improves the lattice action in various ways, to minimize mainly finite spacing errors.

Lattice perturbation theory
In lattice perturbation theory the scattering matrix is expanded in powers of the lattice spacing, a. The results are used primarily to renormalize Lattice QCD Monte-Carlo calculations. In perturbative calculations both the operators of the action and the propagators are calculated on the lattice and expanded in powers of a. When renormalizing a calculation, the coefficients of the expansion need to be matched with a common continuum scheme, such as the MS-bar scheme, otherwise the results cannot be compared. The expansion has to be carried out to the same order in the continuum scheme and the lattice one.

The lattice regularization was initially introduced by Wilson as a framework for studying strongly coupled theories non-perturbatively. However, it was found to be a regularization suitable also for perturbative calculations. Perturbation theory involves an expansion in the coupling constant, and is well-justified in high-energy QCD where the coupling constant is small, while it fails completely when the coupling is large and higher order corrections are larger than lower orders in the perturbative series. In this region non-perturbative methods, such as Monte-Carlo sampling of the correlation function, are necessary.

Lattice perturbation theory can also provide results for condensed matter theory. One can use the lattice to represent the real atomic crystal. In this case the lattice spacing is a real physical value, and not an artifact of the calculation which has to be removed (a UV regulator), and a quantum field theory can be formulated and solved on the physical lattice.

Quantum computing
In 2005 researchers of the National Institute of Informatics reformulated the U(1), SU(2), and SU(3) lattice gauge theories into a form that can be simulated using "spin qubit manipulations" on a universal quantum computer.

Limitations
The method suffers from a few limitations:
 Currently there is no formulation of lattice QCD that allows us to simulate the real-time dynamics of a quark-gluon system such as quark–gluon plasma.
 It is computationally intensive, with the bottleneck not being flops but the bandwidth of memory access.
 It provides reliable predictions only for hadrons containing heavy quarks, such as hyperons, which have one or more strange quarks.

See also
 Lattice model (physics)
 Lattice field theory
 Lattice gauge theory
 QCD matter
 SU(2) color superconductivity
 QCD sum rules
 Wilson action

References

Further reading
 M. Creutz, Quarks, gluons and lattices, Cambridge University Press 1985.
 I. Montvay and G. Münster, Quantum Fields on a Lattice, Cambridge University Press 1997.
 J. Smit, Introduction to Quantum Fields on a Lattice, Cambridge University Press 2002.
 H. Rothe, Lattice Gauge Theories, An Introduction, World Scientific 2005.
 T. DeGrand and C. DeTar, Lattice Methods for Quantum Chromodynamics, World Scientific 2006.
 C. Gattringer and C. B. Lang, Quantum Chromodynamics on the Lattice, Springer 2010.

External links
 Gupta - Introduction to Lattice QCD
 Lombardo - Lattice QCD at Finite Temperature and Density
 Chandrasekharan, Wiese - An Introduction to Chiral Symmetry on the Lattice
 Kuti, Julius - Lattice QCD and String Theory
 The FermiQCD Library for Lattice Field theory
 Flavour Lattice Averaging Group

Lattice field theory
Quantum chromodynamics